Inverness, Nairn, Badenoch and Strathspey, may refer to:

 Inverness, Nairn, Badenoch and Strathspey (UK Parliament constituency), a Scottish constituency of the House of Commons of the Parliament of the United Kingdom
 Inverness, Nairn and Badenoch and Strathspey, one of three corporate management areas of the Highland Council, Scotland, created in 2005